Discrimination against transgender men and transmasculine individuals, sometimes referred to as transandrophobia, anti-transmasculinity, or transmisandry, is a similar concept to transmisogyny and discrimination against non-binary people. Transmisogyny, discrimination against transgender men and discrimination against nonbinary people are extensions of transphobia which focus on trans women, trans men and nonbinary people respectively.

Etymology of terms for the discrimination against transgender men 
There is no consensus on an official term for the discrimination against transgender men, however, many terms have been proposed by members of the transmasculine community. 

Following the structure of language set out by the term transmisogyny- which combines 'trans-' with 'misogyny' (in order to convey that transmisogyny is a bigotry that primarily affects trans women and transfeminine people by targeting their femininity)- transmisandry combines 'trans-' with 'misandry' (in order to convey that transmisandry is a bigotry that primarily affects transgender men and transmasculine people by targeting their masculinity). 'Transandrophobia' is also used, using the suffix 'androphobia' instead.

Legal cases concerning discrimination against transgender men

Murder of Brandon Teena 

Brandon Teena was a trans man who was raped and murdered in December 1993 whilst living in Humbodlt, Nebraska. His death, alongside two of his friends, Phillip DeVine and Lisa Lambert, is thought to be a hate crime motivated by his status as a transgender man. His murderers, Marvin Nissen and John Lotter forced Teena to remove his trousers at a Christmas party to prove to Teena's partner that he had a vulva. Nissen and Lotter then forced Teena into a car and drove to a meat packing plant in Richardson County, where they subsequently beat and raped him. Afterward, Teena's assaulters took him to Nissen's home and forced him to take a shower there. Teena escaped from the bathroom window and sought refuge at Tisdel's house. Tisdel convinced Teena to file a report to the police about the rape, but Teena was nervous in doing so as Nissen and Lotter had threatened they would "silence him permanently" if he did.  

Upon arrival at the police station a rape kit was assembled for Teena, but Teena would never receive the kit as it was subsequently lost. Later, when questioned by Sheriff Charles B Laux, an inappropriate focus was put on Teena's status as a transgender man, which led Teena to refuse to answer some of the questions. Teena is said to have found the questions 'rude and unnecessary'. Later, Nissen and Lotter would learn of Teena's report to the police and they began to look for him. Before they found him however, they were taken in for questioning themselves. Sheriff Laux refused to arrest them, reportedly because Teena had presented himself as a man when previously arrested, but now was presenting himself as a woman in order to access a rape kit, due to his ability to get pregnant.  

Many reproductive healthcare settings require the affected person to be perceived as female, or healthcare will not be dispensed. For example: access to the emergency contraceptive pill is restricted to people who appear as cisgender women in many UK pharmacies and sexual health clinics. Cisgender men cannot buy or otherwise obtain the pill to give the person who will take it, as the duty of care of pharmacists means that they must see the individual who is going to take the pill in person and assess their suitability for it. Due to transphobia and cissexism, transgender men who pass as cisgender men may be denied pregnancy terminating reproductive healthcare on the basis that pregnancy in men is still largely unheard of. As a result of these kinds of barriers to reproductive health, Teena may have presented himself as a woman to the police station in order to avoid any delays in assistance. Sheriff Laux is reported to have said "What kind of a person was she? The first few times we arrested her she was putting herself off as a guy." in defence of his refusal to arrest Nissen and Lotter. 

On the 31st of December 1993 Nissen and Lotter broke into the home of Lisa Lambert, where Teena was hiding. They subsequently killed every adult in the house, including Teena, Lambert and Phillip DeVine. 

Teena is buried in Lincoln Memorial Cemetery, in Lincoln Nebraska. His headstone misgenders him as a "daughter, sister, friend".

Media Coverage 
The media coverage of Teena's death is somewhat controversial. Several scholars have pointed out the inaccuracies of subsequent film adaptations of the events leading up to Teena's murder in 1993. Televised coverage also drew criticism, after Saturday Night Live cast member Norm MacDonald remarked "Excuse me if this sounds harsh, but in my mind they all deserved to die" during the program's 400th episode broadcast on the 24th February 1996. This was received negatively by many trans and lesbian communities, who viewed the comments as inflammatory towards the transmasculine community.

Ewan Forbes and the exclusion from male primogeniture 

Ewan Forbes was a Scottish trans man, who in 1968 was challenged to his right to inherit his father's baronetcy by his cousin, through the means of invasive medical testing and procedures. He won the baronetcy, but the case was subsequently hidden so as to not enable future cases in trans law to draw upon it as a precedent. Zoe Playdon notes that the hiding of this case is due in part to discrimination against transgender men and ultimately had the effect of delaying transgender acceptance in the United Kingdom for the next 50 years.

Prejudice 
Prejudice against transgender men can often stem from both (non systematic) misandry -the malignment of maleness or masculinity- and misogyny (due to wrongly being perceived as women). The complexity of this prejudice and the need for a name has previously been addressed by trans woman and author Julia Serano.  

Serano coined transmisogyny in her book Whipping Girl in 2007, in which she described the complexities of transmisogyny for the first time. In 2021 she made a post to her personal blog clarifying on the usage of the term and to address the gap in language for a word for the discrimination against transgender men. "Transmisogyny can be a vital term for some of us to communicate the intersection of transphobia and misogyny that we face. But others may experience it more complicatedly or severely, as in the case of transmisogynoir. And for others (e.g., certain nonbinary people, trans male/masculine-spectrum people), misogyny may intersect with transphobia in different ways that aren’t adequately articulated by transmisogyny. This doesn’t necessarily make transmisogyny “wrong”; it may simply mean that we need additional language."The needs of trans men have often been under catered for. Susan Stryker in Transgender History, writes that the early trans organisation Labyrinth was created to fill the gap in support for the transmasculine community. Stryker writes that most of the other organisations at the time "were geared more towards the needs of transgender women than transgender men".

Misogyny 
Misogyny aimed at people assigned female at birth often involves both medical and social policing that is usually associated with the way in which cis women experience it; however, in the case of transgender men this misogyny is combined with transphobic discrimination. 

Transgender men and transmasculine people face marginalisation in these contexts that cis women do not face. This includes difficulty in accessing cervical smears where transmasculine individuals are subjected to misgendering that cis women do not generally experience, due to having  gender identities that are incongruent with the gendered medical care they require. The pap smear test is also more likely to be inadequate in detecting cervical cancer in transgender men who use masculinizing hormone therapy.

Transgender men and transmasculine people are at a high risk for sexual assault, sexual violence and rape. The 2015 U.S. Transgender Survey found that 51% of trans men reported being sexually assaulted at least once in their lives compared to only 21.3% of cisgender women. One non-profit study undertaken in 2011 found that, of the 1,005 trans people involved in the study, 50% of Female to Male (FTM) respondents reported experiencing childhood sexual assault. A further 31% reported sexual assault as an adult, 23% listed violence in dating, 36% had experienced domestic violence, 18% had experienced stalking and 29% had experienced hate violence. Despite transgender men and transmasculine people's high rates of sexual assault, many rape and sexual assault crisis centres are not open to men, cis or trans, leading to transmasculine people being put at risk of not having any resources after a sexually-motivated hate crime.  

Counting Ourselves also found that only 11% of trans participants had been able to receive support after sexual violence and abuse and that 33% of transgender men had to explain the existence of transgender men to healthcare professionals when seeking support, compared to 14% of trans women having to do the same. The study found that 50% of transgender men experienced someone attempting to or succeeding in having sex with them against their will.

Medical abuse 
Trans men and transmasculine people are often medically marginalised with 42% of trans men reporting negative experiences with healthcare providers. Transmasculine people frequently face medical issues because they are simultaneously transgender and have been assigned female at birth. There is a lack of credible research about how to provide adequate healthcare to transmasculine people undergoing medical transition, notably with doctors having difficulty diagnosing breast cancer in people who have undergone top surgery. Transmasculine people are also at an increased risk for experiencing discrimination in medicine that may impact their access to healthcare. This can include transmasculine people with cervixes not being invited for life-saving cervical screenings because their gender is legally listed as male or being denied screenings for ovarian cancer despite this putting transmasculine people at a higher risk of developing it than cisgender women. 

Trans men are sometimes omitted from discussions about reproductive rights, menstruation, and bodily autonomy because they are seen exclusively as "women's issues". This includes healthcare professionals neglecting to discuss contraception to prevent unwanted transgender pregnancy. 

Trans men and transmasculine people are at a greater risk of developing HIV or AIDS. Between 2009 and 2014, trans men accounted for 11% of HIV-positive transgender individuals in the U.S. with 60% of them being virally suppressed for at least one year. This study conducted by the American Public Health Association states that "transgender men who have sex with men are at increased risk for HIV acquisition and [. . .] constitute 15.4% of the newly diagnosed HIV cases among transgender persons. Transgender men are an understudied population lacking evidence-based HIV interventions to address their needs." The majority of PrEP medications such as Descovy that are meant to prevent contraction of HIV have not been tested for people who were assigned female at birth. 47% of HIV-positive trans men in the U.S. between 2009 and 2014 and 40% of HIV-positive trans men in the U.S. in 2018 were black. Omission from medical research leaves trans men vulnerable to illnesses, STDs, and malpractice.

Social abuse

Effect on transgender men's mental health 

Transmasculine people may face social abuse. Negativity towards transmasculine people's manhoods contribute to severe mental health problems. A 2018 study published in the Official Journal of the American Academy of Pediatrics found that 50.8% of transgender boys (ages 11–19) have attempted suicide. When discussing the results of this study, the researchers stated that: "There is an urgent need to understand why transgender, female to male, and nonbinary adolescents report engaging in suicide behavior at higher levels than other adolescent transgender populations. Qualitative methods are best positioned to deepen our understanding of this point. Previous research in adults reveals that transgender men report higher levels of gender discrimination compared with transgender women, which may help to explain this difference in suicide behavior. Yet, few researchers have engaged in rigorous comparative research on the interpersonal and contextual experiences of transgender subgroups." In addition, a 2013 study on transgender men's sexual health mentions that "Transgender men have concomitant psychosocial health vulnerabilities which may contribute to sexual risk behaviours. Future research is needed to understand the myriad social, behavioural, and biological factors that contribute to HIV and STD vulnerability for FTMs".

Other attitudes displayed towards transgender men and transmasculine people involve perceiving them as incapable of making their own decisions about their life and transition. This often stems from misogynistic attitudes that affect cis women similarly. These attitudes treat transgender men and transmasculine people as if they are unable to know what is best for them due to their sex assigned at birth.

TDOR, an organisation which collects reports of transgender people lost to violence, has reported on many transgender men who have lost their lives to suicide caused by prejudice against their transmasculinity.

Gender essentialism 
According to Mimi Marinucci, gender essentialism is a  radical feminist view of gender, and it is foundational to feminism as expressed by trans exclusionary radical feminists  towards transgender people. She states that as a result of this, while their targeting towards trans women is more visible, transgender men are also routinely targeted with gender essentialist arguments. She argues that gender essentialism demonises masculinity and maleness as a whole, targeting trans women for their assigned sex at birth and rendering trans men's transitions as something to be targeted, such as by calling it 'mutilating surgery'.

Racism 
Trans men and transmasculine people of colour face a unique discrimination as a result of their race and maleness intersecting.

An interviewee for the project To Survive on this Shore discusses the issue of racism against trans men:"In the beginning, when I started transitioning, when my features started changing, when it got to the point where I was totally male, I wondered why people were treating me differently. Other races were treating me differently. And I realized, I'm a black male now, and so when I step on the elevator, the woman's going to clutch her pocketbook, or she's going to move to the other side of the elevator, or I get doors slammed in my face. You know?" - Charley, 2014

Citing Krell, Martino and Omercajic explain that "'racialized transmisandry' helps to explain the policing around Black masculinity for Black transmasculine persons [who] have been effaced in a white-centric and classed framing of cisgenderism and cissexism".

Disputes

Feminist reception 
The intersection between discrimination against transgender men and misogyny has split feminist opinion on the inclusion of trans men in feminism, particularly feminism that concerns itself with reproductive rights and domestic abuse. Many feminist organisations welcome transgender men (as well as transgender women and nonbinary people), however, a number of trans exclusive radical feminist organisations do not welcome transgender men on the basis of their manhood. Other feminist organisations have adopted a 'trans inclusive radical feminist' approach, which includes trans women and some nonbinary people, but may often exclude transgender men on the basis of their manhood as well, despite transgender men's similarities in experiencing misogyny with other trans people and with cis women.

References

Further reading

Discrimination against LGBT people
transgender men
Misandry
Transphobia